The Taiyuan–Zhongwei–Yinchuan railway is a railway line in northern China, connecting Taiyuan, the capital of Shanxi Province, with Zhongwei and Yinchuan in Ningxia Hui Autonomous Region. It is a double-track electric railway,  opened in 2011.

Routing
The main line of the railway runs in the general east-west direction from Taiyuan to Zhongwei via Lüliang and 
Dingbian, serving a number of communities in western Shanxi, northern Shaanxi and Ningxia, many of which previously did not have rail service at all. The Dingbian-Yinchuan branch runs from Dingbian northwest, to Ningxia's capital city Yinchuan.

The railway also has a short dead-end branch from Lüliang to Lin County (Linxian) in the northwestern Shanxi.

In some areas (a section of the main line east of Dingbian, and the Dingbian-Yinchuan branch), the railway route roughly parallels the Great Wall of China.

Service
Together with the Shijiazhuang–Taiyuan high-speed railway, the Taiyuan–Zhongwei–Yinchuan railway provides a more direct route between Beijing and Ningxia than those that were available before. Together with the Zhongwei-Wuwei line in Ningxia and Gansu, it offers a shorter route between Beijing and Xinjiang than the more standard route via Zhengzhou and Lanzhou.

History
Construction started in May 2006. The railway was opened on January 11, 2011.

Rail junctions
Taiyuan: Shijiazhuang–Taiyuan railway, Taiyuan–Jiaozuo railway, Shitai passenger railway
Liulin:Shanxi–Henan–Shandong railway
Suide:Shenmu–Yan'an railway
Zhongwei:Baotou–Lanzhou railway
Yichuan:Baotou–Lanzhou railway

References

Railway lines in China
Rail transport in Shanxi
Rail transport in Shaanxi
Rail transport in Ningxia
Railway lines opened in 2011
25 kV AC railway electrification